The Hunts, by Amelia Biagioni, is a book of poems written originally in Spanish.

Description
A bilingual edition of an astonishing poetic cycle that ranges across time and space to recreate the eternal hunt:  the unstoppable, restless process of the universe chasing, tormenting and consuming itself.

Summary 
A bilingual edition of Las Cacerías, an enraptured poetic cycle that takes the reader through the delirious swirl of the eternal hunt on Earth and in heaven, in the past, present and future.  Sections of the cycle relate to the ancient sport of man pursuing beast, beast pursuing beast, man pursuing man, and the poet's quest to capture life and identity within words.  The final section presents the author as a woman pursued as a heretic, for having "spied on God."

Reviews 
"... the poetry of Las Cacerías is akin to ritual and hymn..."

Editions 
Translated from Spanish, and with an Introduction by Renata Treitel. Grand Terrace, CA: Xenos Books.   (paper), 135 p.

References

Poetry collections